Lucjan Błaszczyk (born 28 December 1974 in Lwówek Śląski) is a Polish table tennis player. He competed for Poland at the Olympic Games in Atlanta, Sydney, Athens and Beijing.

References

External links
 

1974 births
Living people
People from Lwówek Śląski
Polish male table tennis players
Olympic table tennis players of Poland
Table tennis players at the 1996 Summer Olympics
Table tennis players at the 2000 Summer Olympics
Table tennis players at the 2004 Summer Olympics
Table tennis players at the 2008 Summer Olympics
Sportspeople from Lower Silesian Voivodeship